Sylvester Dias (9 February 1937 – 1 December 2013) was a Sri Lankan cricketer. He played first-class cricket for Ceylon between 1964 and 1968.

References

External links
 

"Sylvester Dias: An Appreciation of Cricketer and Person"
"Bowler who terrorised batsmen" by Sa'adi Thawfeeq in The Nation

1937 births
2013 deaths
All-Ceylon cricketers
Sri Lankan cricketers
Moratuwa Sports Club cricketers
Cricketers from Colombo